Disney Junior is a brand of children's television channels owned and operated by The Walt Disney Company, aimed at small children between 2 to 7 years old. Since its American debut on February 14, 2011 (Valentine's Day 2011), the brand was launched worldwide. In most countries the channel was formerly known as Playhouse Disney.

Disney Junior started closing internationally in 2019, mostly in Europe and Asia-Pacific, as it transitioned viewers to Disney+ and Disney Channel's morning blocks, while other versions remain.

Background 
The first Disney Junior to launch outside the U.S. was in Latin America on April 1, 2011, replacing the Playhouse Disney Channel, it later rebranded in most countries replacing their Playhouse Disney brands mostly in 2011. Such as Canada on May 6, the United Kingdom and Ireland on May 7, Italy on May 14, France on May 28, Australia and New Zealand on May 29, the pan-CEMA feed (Central and Eastern Europe, the Middle East, and Africa) on June 1, and Spain on June 11.

Japan and India's programming blocks were rebranded on July 3 and 4 respectively, with channels in Southeast Asia, Hong Kong and South Korea on July 11, along with Germany, Austria and Switzerland on July 14, Israel on July 18, and Scandinavia and the Benelux (Netherlands, Belgium, and Luxembourg) on September 10.

The Romanian channel launched on March 1, 2012, India and Japan's channels were also launched on October 1 and 15 respectively, It became available in Portugal since November 1, 2012, and Russia's block rebranded on September 1, 2013, concluding the Playhouse Disney brand.

The Hungarian feed was launched on July 1, 2015, but shut down in late 2017 due to lack of distributing for most of the Hungarian pay TV providers. It would plan to cease on October 12, but moved instead to December 5, discontinuing the Hungarian language audio track.

Disney Junior in Canada (both English and French), originally owned by DHX Media, discontinued on September 18, 2015 as Corus Entertainment acquires Disney's rights. The English version relaunched on December 1, 2015, however, La Chaîne Disney's block, Disney Junior sur La Chaîne Disney,  carries most preschool shows in French.

On April 1, 2019, Disney Junior discontinued in the Netherlands, while it continues broadcasting in Belgium (particularly the Flanders), however after a year of absence, most programs returned to Mickey Mornings on Disney Channel since November 17, 2020. Some Disney Junior channels were discontinued in favor for Disney+, such as Australia and New Zealand on April 30, 2020, Italy on May 1, and the United Kingdom and Ireland on October 1.

The same closure occurred in Malaysia on January 1, 2021, the German channel on September 30, Southeast Asia, Hong Kong and South Korea on October 1, Taiwan's programming block on Disney Channel on December 31, 2021, and the Brazilian feed on April 1, 2022, with the Russian block halted in December that year.

Current channels 

Except for DirecTV, which replaced NASA TV, which moved to another channel and is still airing today. In DirecTV's case, Soapnet was replaced by an Informercial Channel.

Former channels

See also

List of programs broadcast by Disney Junior
 Disney Xtreme Digital, a video streaming service on Disney.com

References

TV channels
Disney Channel related-lists
Junior TV channels